Maurizio Cheli (born 4 May 1959, in Zocca) is an Italian air force officer, a European Space Agency astronaut and a veteran of one NASA Space Shuttle mission.

A native of Modena, Cheli attended the Italian Air Force Academy and trained as a test pilot in 1988 at the Empire Test Pilots' School, England. He was awarded the McKenna Trophy as the best student on his course, as well as the Sir Alan Cobham Award for the highest standard of flying and the Hawker Hunter Thropy for he best Preview Handling report. He studied geophysics at the University of Rome La Sapienza and earned a master's degree in aerospace engineering from the University of Houston. He then trained with the United States Air Force and was selected as an astronaut candidate by the European Space Agency in 1992. He holds the rank of lieutenant colonel in the Italian Air Force. He flew aboard STS-75 in 1996 as a mission specialist.

That same year he joined Alenia Aeronautica, and two years later he became Chief Test Pilot for combat aircraft. His last test program was for the Eurofighter Typhoon.

Maurizio Cheli has more than 380 hours of space activity and more than 4500 flying hours on more than 50 different aircraft types.

He is married to fellow former ESA astronaut Marianne Merchez.

During the 2009 Torino World Air Games, on 12 June 2009 the SkySpark experimental aircraft piloted by Cheli logged the speed world record for its class, powered by an electric engine designed by the DigiSky, an aviation technologies firm founded by Cheli himself in 2005.

External links
 Official web site Mauriziocheli.com
 ESA profile page
 NASA Biography
 Spacefacts biography of Maurizio Cheli

1959 births
Living people
People from Modena
Italian astronauts
University of Houston alumni
Sapienza University of Rome alumni
Recipients of the Medal of Aeronautic Valor
Space Shuttle program astronauts